The Ruth Lilly Poetry Prize is awarded annually by The Poetry Foundation, which also publishes Poetry magazine. The prize was established in 1986 by Ruth Lilly. It honors a living U.S. poet whose "lifetime accomplishments warrant extraordinary recognition"; its value is $100,000 making it one of the richest literary prizes in the world.  The prize has been called "among the most prestigious awards that can be won by an American poet".

Winners
The following list is based on the listing by the Poetry Foundation.

1986: Adrienne Rich
1987: Philip Levine
1988: Anthony Hecht
1989: Mona Van Duyn
1990: Hayden Carruth
1991: David Wagoner
1992: John Ashbery
1993: Charles Wright
1994: Donald Hall
1995: A. R. Ammons
1996: Gerald Stern
1997: William Matthews
1998: W. S. Merwin
1999: Maxine Kumin
2000: Carl Dennis
2001: Yusef Komunyakaa
2002: Lisel Mueller
2003: Linda Pastan
2004: Kay Ryan
2005: C. K. Williams
2006: Richard Wilbur
2007: Lucille Clifton
2008: Gary Snyder
2009: Fanny Howe
2010: Eleanor Ross Taylor
2011: David Ferry
2012: W. S. Di Piero
2013: Marie Ponsot
2014: Nathaniel Mackey
2015: Alice Notley
2016: Ed Roberson
2017: Joy Harjo
2018: Martín Espada
2019: Marilyn Nelson
2020: Marilyn Chin
2021: Patricia Smith 
2022: Sandra Cisneros, CAConrad, Rita Dove, Nikki Giovanni, Juan Felipe Herrera, Angela Jackson, Haki R. Madhubuti, Sharon Olds, Sonia Sanchez, Patti Smith and Arthur Sze

See also
American poetry
List of poetry awards
List of literary awards
List of years in poetry
List of years in literature

References

American poetry awards
Literary awards honoring lifetime achievement
Poetry Foundation